Class of '74 (and subsequently Class of '75) was a secondary school-based, daily soap opera screened on the Seven Network in Australia and produced by Reg Grundy Organisation in  black-and-white starting March 1974 

Marist Singer's of Eastwood, provided back up singing for the school choir.

Program synopsis
The main characters were a mix of teachers and other school personnel, and students. The series was aimed at a teenage audience. Each episode was 30 minutes; five episodes each week were broadcast, stripped across week nights in an early evening timeslot. The series was renamed Class of '75 for its second and final year. Although originally produced in black and white it switched  to colour broadcasting during its second year of production.

Main cast

Principal cast members included:

Teachers, staff and adults

Students

and in 1975:

Miscellaneous

Cast members Teale, Hamblin and Glenwright continued the program's entire run.

See also 
 List of Australian television series

References

External links 
 Aussie Soap Archive: Class of '74 — Overview and review; Archived 19 April 2020
 
Class of 74 at the National Film and Sound Archive

1974 Australian television series debuts
1975 Australian television series endings
1970s high school television series
1970s teen drama television series
1970s television soap operas
Australian television soap operas
Australian high school television series
Seven Network original programming
Television series produced by The Reg Grundy Organisation
Television shows set in New South Wales
Black-and-white Australian television shows
English-language television shows
Television series about educators
Television series about teenagers